Armande de La Tour d'Auvergne (28 August 1697 – 13 April 1717) was a French noblewoman and Princess of Epinoy by marriage. She died without issue.

Biography

Armande was the eldest of seven children born to Emmanuel Théodose de La Tour d'Auvergne - sovereign Duke of Bouillon - and his first wife Marie Armande Victoire de La Trémouille. Her mother died in 1717 and her father married three more times and had three more children.

She married Louis de Melun, Duke of Joyeuse and Prince of Epinoy on 23 February 1716. His parents were Louis de Melun and Élisabeth Thérèse de Lorraine.

Armande died in 1717 a month after her mother. Her husband was later the secret spouse of Marie Anne de Bourbon (1697–1741), daughter of Monsieur le Duc and Madame la Duchesse, daughter of Madame de Montespan. Louis de Melun later disappeared in 1724 under mysterious circumstances.

Ancestry

References and notes

1697 births
1717 deaths
17th-century French people
18th-century French people
17th-century French women
18th-century French women
Armande
Armande
Armande
Armande
Deaths in childbirth
People of Byzantine descent